Comoros competed at the 2011 World Aquatics Championships in Shanghai, China between July 16 and 31, 2011.

Swimming

Comoros qualified 3 swimmers.

Men

Women

References

Nations at the 2011 World Aquatics Championships
2011
World Aquatics Championships